The Vijay for Best Story, Screenplay Writer is given by STAR Vijay as part of its annual Vijay Awards ceremony for Tamil  (Kollywood) films.

The list
Here is a list of the award winners and the films for which they won.

Nominations
2007 Viji - Mozhi
Ameer Sultan - Paruthiveeran
Madhavan and Seeman - Evano Oruvan
Ram - Katrathu Tamil
Venkat Prabhu - Chennai 600028
2008 Kamal Haasan - Dasavathaaram
Gautham Vasudev Menon - Vaaranam Aayiram
Mysskin - Anjathey 
Sasikumar - Subramaniapuram
2009 Arivazhagan Venkatachalam - Eeram
Jayamohan and Bala - Naan Kadavul
Pandiraj - Pasanga
Samudrakani - Naadodigal 
Vikram Kumar - Yaavarum Nalam
2010 Prabhu Solomon - Mynaa
Gautham Vasudev Menon - Vinnaithaandi Varuvaayaa
Sargunam - Kalavani
Suseenthiran and Bhaskar Sakthi - Naan Mahaan Alla
Vasanthabalan and Jayamohan - Angadi Theru
 2011 Thiagarajan Kumararaja - Aaranya Kaandam
 K. V. Anand and Subha - Ko
 M. Saravanan - Engaeyum Eppothum
 Raghava Lawrence - Kanchana
 Vetrimaaran - Aadukalam
 2012 Karthik Subbaraj - Pizza
Balaji Sakthivel - Vazhakku Enn 18/9
Balaji Tharaneetharan  - Naduvula Konjam Pakkatha Kaanom
Rajesh - Oru Kal Oru Kannadi
S. S. Rajamouli - Naan Ee
 2013 Nalan Kumarasamy - Soodhu Kavvum
 Alphonse Putharen - Neram
 Atlee - Raja Rani
 Lenin Bharathi, Suseenthiran - Aadhalal Kadhal Seiveer
 Naveen - Moodar Koodam
 2014 Vijay Milton - Goli Soda
 Karthik Subbaraj - Jigarthanda
 R. Parthiepan - Kathai Thiraikathai Vasanam Iyakkam
 Ram - Mundasupatti
 Velraj - Velaiyilla Pattathari
 2017 Pushkar–Gayathri – Vikram Vedha
 A. R. K. Sarvan – Maragadha Naanayam
 Arun Prabu Purushothaman – Aruvi
 H. Vinoth – Theeran Adhigaram Ondru
 Lokesh Kanagaraj – Maanagaram

See also
 Tamil cinema
 Cinema of India

References

Dialogue Writer